The Wieland Brewery Building is a historic building located on Mineral Street in Tonopah, Nevada. Built in 1901, the building was the first stone building constructed in Tonopah. It was also one of the first permanent buildings built in the town, which was still primarily a mining camp at the time. The building had several owners in its early years. It was apparently first owned by H.C. Brougher, but businessman Harry King bought the brewery by the end of 1901. King sold the brewery to two other businessmen in the spring 1902 but purchased it again by the following October. At the end of 1902, King added a crafted parapet to the building, which indicates that Tonopah had local stone craftsmen by that time.

The brewery was added to the National Register of Historic Places on May 20, 1982.

References

Tonopah, Nevada
Buildings and structures in Nye County, Nevada
Industrial buildings completed in 1901
Industrial buildings and structures on the National Register of Historic Places in Nevada
National Register of Historic Places in Tonopah, Nevada
1901 establishments in Nevada